Blue Water Cycling is a Danish road cycling team that was formed in 2009 as a merger between Herning CK and Team Løgstør-Cycling for Health. It is currently a UCI Continental Team, competing on the UCI Europe Tour. For the 2012 season, the team's riders are exclusively Danish.

The two most successful members of the team are Rasmus Quaade, who has won Danish national road titles five times (though only once with Blue Water), and Lasse Norman Hansen, who competed at the 2012 Summer Olympics, winning a gold medal in the men's omnium and placing fifth in the team pursuit.

Major wins
2012
Stage 4 Rás Tailteann: Mark Sehested
Stage 7 Rás Tailteann: Lasse Norman Hansen
Men's Omnium Olympic Games, Lasse Norman Hansen
2013
GP Herning, Lasse Norman Hansen
Rund um den Finanzplatz Eschborn-Frankfurt U23, Lasse Norman Hansen
Overall Tour de Berlin, Mathias Møller
Stage 2 (ITT), Lasse Norman Hansen
 Danish National Under-23 Time Trial Championships, Lasse Norman Hansen
 Danish National Under-23 Road Race Championships, Lasse Norman Hansen
Stage 1a (ITT) Tour de Slovaquie, Mathias Møller

Team roster
As of 29 January 2013.

See also
Cycling at the 2012 Summer Olympics
Cycling at the 2012 Summer Olympics – Men's omnium

References

External links
Team website

Cycling teams based in Denmark
UCI Continental Teams (Europe)
Cycling teams established in 2009